The stichting BREIN (Bescherming Rechten Entertainment Industrie Nederland) translates roughly as association for the Protection of the Rights of the Entertainment Industry of the Netherlands. BREIN is an association in which the Dutch recording industry and movie studios participate.

Participants
Several organizations or rights holders in the Entertainment Industry are participants in the organization. Those are amongst others:
 Buma/Stemra
 Nederlandse Vereniging van Producenten en Importeurs van Beeld- en Geluidsdragers
 Motion Pictures Association
 Nederlandse Vereniging van Filmdistributeurs
 Bridge Entertainment Group B.V.
 Nederlandse Vereniging van Bioscoopexploitanten
 Stichting Videma
 Nederlandse Vereniging van Entertainment Retailers
 Nederlandse Uitgeversverbond

Shutdowns of alleged piracy sites
BREIN is known for shutting down Dutch eDonkey 2000 link giant ShareConnector in December 2004. Due to controversy over the legality of links to illegal content, and a lack of quality in the evidence provided by BREIN, the case was not put to trial for several years. After being offline for two years, ShareConnector reopened in December 2006 but on November 12, 2007, Shareconnector went offline again.

On March 16, 2010 the Amsterdam Court of Appeal ruled that sites that offer hash links (like .torrent links) were facilitating copyright infringement, an unlawful behavior. Shareconnector did not make the content available to the public because they did not have control over the content itself and they did not interfere in the up- and downloading process. However, the Court of Appeal ruled that the site was illegal because their procedure made it easier for users to retrieve the illegal content from the eDonkey network.

On October 23, 2007 BREIN, together with IFPI, BPI, Dutch police, and other organizations shut down prominent Bittorrent tracker Oink's Pink Palace.

In a civil court case which BREIN filed in the Netherlands against the founders of The Pirate Bay, on 22 October 2009 the Amsterdam District Court ruled that The Pirate Bay was not making a direct infringement but its facilitating activities amount to an unlawful act. The Court ordered The Pirate Bay to remove a list of torrents that link to copyright-protected works in the Netherlands and to make these torrents on its websites inaccessible for Internet users in the Netherlands. The Pirate Bay ignored the verdict.

In January 2012 BREIN announced that a Dutch court had ordered Ziggo and XS4ALL to block all access to The Pirate Bay. On May 10, 2012 this judgement was followed by a court order of the District Court in The Hague against UPC, KPN, T-Mobile and Tele2 to also block The Pirate Bay for their customers.

Ziggo and XS4ALL appealed this verdict and won, with BREIN being ordered to pay 326,000 Euro as a compensation for process costs.

Lawsuit by FTD
After a series of allegations that Usenet community Fill Threads Database (FTD) was acting illegally, the Dutch FTD started a lawsuit against BREIN in May 2009. BREIN president Tim Kuik alleged in a Dutch newspaper that "Although they [FTD] are not carrying illegal content on their servers, what FTD does is simply criminal". FTD is suing for a retraction of this libelous statement and demands a declaration from the courts that its activities are entirely within the law.

On February 9, 2011 the Dutch District Court of Haarlem ruled, that FTD had acted unlawfully and issued an injunction. FTD was obliged to ban all references to files of BREIN members.

The court also ruled that Tim Kuik was free to expose the conduct of FTD and communicate the opinion of BREIN. The request for rectification was therefore rejected by the court.

FTD ceased all its operations a few weeks after the verdict.

Alleged attack on BREIN website
On the 1 June 2009 Tim Kuik published an online article claiming BREIN's website was "broken" by hackers performing DDoS attacks. He speculated about a possible connection with the intended court summons against The Pirate Bay. Several independent sources reported the site's deep links were still available (only the frontpage was inaccessible) and as such BREIN's claim of having been attacked was false. Brein responded claiming the attacks had stopped and that the site's year old backup had been used to recover the site. Because the backup was dated, the website was now under construction.

Internet blog Geenstijl purportedly discovered BREIN's server was still fully operational and there had been no attack whatsoever - the complete news archive was still available. (A password was later added to BREIN's news archive to prevent further checks on availability.)

On 23 June 2009 The Pirate Bay announced a lawsuit against Tim Kuik on libel charges, claiming The Pirate Bay had nothing to do with the alleged DDoS attack.

Criticism
In September 2009 BREIN CEO Tim Kuik attracted controversy when in a news conference he stated he was using a laptop confiscated from a "pirate" and given to him by someone involved with the case.

BREIN attracted controversy again when several suspicious aspects of their lawsuit against The Pirate Bay and Reservella were revealed, including evidence that documents used to link Fredrik Neij of The Pirate Bay to Reservella were faked. Peter Sunde and the Dutch Pirate Party filed criminal felony charges against both Tim Kuik and BREIN for fraud and forgery.

In January 2011, BREIN targeted one of the Internet's largest warez piracy topsites. The site, known as Swan, was taken down by hosting provider WorldStream and without judicial process BREIN seized its servers. The owners of the servers retaliated by seizing them back and may sue BREIN for breach of privacy and property rights as BREIN is a private organization and has no special legal or investigative authority.

References

External links
 

Entertainment industry associations
Trade associations based in the Netherlands
Organisations based in North Holland
Haarlemmermeer